Miglitol is an oral anti-diabetic drug that acts by inhibiting the ability of the patient to break down complex carbohydrates into glucose. It is primarily used in diabetes mellitus type 2 for establishing greater glycemic control by preventing the digestion of carbohydrates (such as disaccharides, oligosaccharides, and polysaccharides) into monosaccharides which can be absorbed by the body.

Miglitol, and other structurally-related iminosugars, inhibit glycoside hydrolase enzymes called alpha-glucosidases.  Since miglitol works by preventing digestion of carbohydrates, it lowers the degree of postprandial hyperglycemia. It must be taken at the start of main meals to have maximal effect. Its effect will depend on the amount of non-monosaccharide carbohydrates in a person's diet.

In contrast to acarbose (another alpha-glucosidase inhibitor), miglitol is systemically absorbed; however, it is not metabolized and is excreted by the kidneys.

See also
 Alpha-glucosidase inhibitor
 Miglustat
 Voglibose

References

Alpha-glucosidase inhibitors
Iminosugars
Piperidines
Polyols